Art of the Improviser is a double CD by American jazz pianist Matthew Shipp featuring two 2010 live performances, a trio date at The Arts Center of the Capital Region in Troy, New York and a solo piano recital at (Le) Poisson Rouge in New York City. It was released on Thirsty Ear's Blue Series.

Reception

In his review for AllMusic, Thom Jurek states "Art of the Improviser serves as a testament to Shipp’s achievements, yet it is also a continuation of the discovery in his developmental musical language."

In a review for JazzTimes Mike Shanley says about the solo date "Shipp tumbles around the keyboard but his ideas always seem fully developed no matter how rapidly he travels."

The All About Jazz review by Mark Corroto states "With the release of Art Of The Improviser, he has essentially summed up his first fifty years on two CDs of resolute and committed music."

The Down Beat review by Alain Drouot notes that "Few pianists can mix swing, angularity and dissonance with Shipp’s poise and aplomb. He negotiates with ease and nimbleness the many twists and turns he challenges himself with."

Track listing
All compositions by Matthew Shipp except as indicated
Disc One
 "The New Fact" - 12:27
 "3 in 1" - 9:15
 "Circular Temple #1" - 16:01
 "Take the "A" Train" (Billy Strayhorn) - 7:44
 "Virgin Complex" - 6:49
Disc Two
 "4D" - 5:39
 "Fly Me to the Moon" (Bart Howard) - 5:12
 "Wholetone" - 8:03
 "Module" - 7:52
 "Gamma Ray" - 7:24
 "Patmos" - 4:50

Personnel
Matthew Shipp - piano
Michael Bisio – bass (Disc One)
Whit Dickey – drums (Disc One)

References

2011 live albums
Matthew Shipp live albums
Solo piano jazz albums
Thirsty Ear Recordings live albums